Sir George Alan Chapman (born 13 April 1927) is a New Zealand accountant, businessman and company director. He was president of the National Party from 1973 to 1982.

Early life
He was born in the Trentham Military Camp, Trentham where his ex-British Army father was chief armourer. His parents were Thomas "Tom" George Chapman and Winifred "Wyn" Jordan Chapman. He was educated at Trentham Primary School, Hutt Valley High School and Victoria University of Wellington.

Political career
Chapman joined the National Party in 1948, and was chairman of the Young Nationals for two years, electorate secretary (1953–58) and chairman (1960–66) of Heretaunga, Wellington Division chairman (1966–73), Dominion Councillor (1964–85), and was party vice-president between 1966 and 1973. In 1971, he challenged the incumbent, Ned Holt, for the presidency of the National Party but lost the vote. He was elected president of the National Party in 1973 and held that role until 1982, and was described as "one of the National Party's most influential presidents" by political historian Barry Gustafson.

He was an Upper Hutt borough councillor from 1952 to 1955 and served as deputy mayor between 1953 and 1955.

In 1977, Chapman was awarded the Queen Elizabeth II Silver Jubilee Medal, and in the 1982 Queen's Birthday Honours he was appointed a Knight Bachelor, for political and public services.

Commercial career
In 1948 when aged 20, he became the borough treasurer for Upper Hutt. Later in the same year, he became a partner in an accountancy firm that was later called Saunders and Chapman and then became Chapman Upchurch. He retired as senior partner in 2000.

Chapman has, since 1948, been a member of the New Zealand Society of Accountants (MNZSA) and was made a fellow (FCA) in 1969. He is a fellow of the Chartered Institute of Secretaries & Administrators (FCIS) and a member of the New Zealand Institute of Directors. He was chairman of the Upper Hutt Chamber of Commerce.

He was chairman of the Housing Corporation (1992–95) and chaired the Housing New Zealand Establishment Board (April–July 1992). He was chairman of the Building Industry Authority (1992–2000). When the Minister of Internal Affairs, George Hawkins, accused him of having known about the leaky building problem, Chapman denied any knowledge and stated that the board was first informed in August 2001, i.e. after his tenure.

Chapman was a director for several companies including the Bank of New Zealand (1968–86, including deputy chairman 1976–86), BNZ Finance (1977–88), Maui Developments Ltd 1979–85, Skellerup Industries Ltd (1982–90), Pilkington (NZ) (1982–94), Norwich Union (NZ) (formerly Norwich Winterthur NZ; 1982–1992), and State Insurance Ltd (1990–1992).

He was board chairman of Pilkington (NZ) (1989–94), BNZ Finance 1979–88, Mitel Telecommunications (NZ) (1984–91), and Norwich Union (NZ) (1982–85).

Private life
Chapman married Jacqueline Sidney Irvine (born 1928) in 1950; she was the daughter of Murray Russell Irvine. They had two sons and five daughters. His wife died in 2009.

Notes

References

Further reading

1927 births
Living people
New Zealand National Party politicians
Victoria University of Wellington alumni
People from Upper Hutt
New Zealand Knights Bachelor
Deputy mayors of places in New Zealand
Local politicians in New Zealand
People educated at Hutt Valley High School